Jean Hubert may refer to:

 Jean Hubert (aircraft designer) (1885–1927), French aviation pioneer and aircraft designer
 Jean Hubert (archaeologist) (1902–1994), French art historian
 Jean Joseph Hubert (1765–1805), French Navy officer and captain